Gebzespor is a Turkish sports club located in Gebze, Kocaeli Province. The football club plays in the Turkish Regional Amateur League.

They have a local rivalry with Kocaelispor.

References

External links
Gebzespor on TFF.org

 
Sport in Gebze
Sport in İzmit
Football clubs in Turkey
Association football clubs established in 1955
1955 establishments in Turkey